Noemi Artemisa Gonzalez is an American actress. She portrayed Soli Gomez in the Hulu series East Los High and portrayed the character of Mia Rosales on CBS Daytime soap opera The Young and the Restless from 2018 to 2019.

Early years and career
Gonzalez was raised in Desert Hot Springs, California and is of Mexican descent.  Gonzalez graduated from Desert Hot Springs High School in Desert Hot Springs, California. She then attended the University of California, Santa Barbara, where she earned a Bachelor of Fine Arts in 2010. In 2013, Gonzalez was cast as Soli Gomez on Hulu's drama series East Los High. Gonzalez continued to appear in many different roles on television, including the FOX drama series Rosewood as well as film, such as 2014's Paranormal Activity: The Marked Ones, and 2020's The Tax Collector. On October 26, 2018, it was announced that Gonzalez was cast as Mia Rosales on CBS's American television soap opera The Young and the Restless. On November 12, 2019, Netflix announced the cast to their upcoming Selena: The Series, based on legendary Tejano artist Selena Quintanilla, which included Gonzalez as the eponymous character's sister, drummer, and the producer of the show, Suzette.

Filmography

References

External links
 

Living people
American actresses of Mexican descent
American film actresses
American television actresses
Hispanic and Latino American actresses
People from Desert Hot Springs, California
1988 births
21st-century American women